Jerónimo Méndez Arancibia (September 25, 1887 – 14 June 1959) was a Chilean politician who served as provisional president.

He was born in Chañaral, where he completed his secondary studies. In 1914 he graduated as an MD from the Universidad de Chile. President Pedro Aguirre Cerda appointed him Minister of the Interior. At the death of President Aguirre Cerda on November 25, 1941, he became provisional President. He called for presidential elections that were won by Juan Antonio Ríos on February 1, 1942.

External links
 Jerónimo Méndez 

1887 births
1959 deaths
Presidents of Chile
Chilean Ministers of Health
People from Chañaral
University of Chile alumni
Chilean people of Basque descent
Members of the Senate of Chile
Vice presidents of Chile
Liceo Gregorio Cordovez alumni
Mayors of places in Chile
Radical Party of Chile politicians